Don Erwin King, Jr. is a former American football  quarter back who played in the National Football League.

Biography
Don Erwin King, Jr. was born on February 10, 1964, in Dallas, Texas, to Don King, Sr. and Judy King. He attended and played quarterback in the Dallas ISD system (Justin F. Kimball High School). He was a two-year starting quarterback at Southern Methodist University, where he earned All-Southwest Conference and Honorable Mention All-American Honors as a quarterback in 1984, and he played a year in the National Football League for the Green Bay Packers. He later graduated and received his BAAS degree from Dallas Baptist University. Kings's passion is helping and developing the minds of young student athletes, so they will become more aware and prepared for life. He is the founder of King Sports Link www.kingsportslink.com. His other involvements include: Certified NESTA Personal Fitness Trainer, group exercise instructor, fitness nutrition coach, and lifestyle weight management coach. Waxahachie High School 9th grade Football and Basketball Coach; King Sports Link Skills Camp, James Johnson Scholarship Golf Tournament, Fellowship of Christian Athletes Huddle Leader, NFL Alumni Association member, Pro Athletes Association member, Texas Basketball Coaches Association and a member of the Texas High School Coaches Association. He is a teacher at Coleman Junior High in Waxahachie Texas.

Career
King was a four year letterman at Southern Methodist University and a two year starter. 1984 All-South West Conference quarterback. King was a member of the Green Bay Packers during the 1987 NFL season.

College statistics:
Career:	Comp: 204; Att: 396; Pct:51.5; Yds:3056; Y/A 7.7; AY/A: 7.0; TD: 13; INT:12; Rate: 121.1

See also
List of Green Bay Packers players

References

1964 births
Living people
Players of American football from Dallas
Kansas City Chiefs players
Green Bay Packers players
American football defensive backs
Southern Methodist University alumni
SMU Mustangs football players